Omar Benrabah Stadium, is a multi-use stadium located in the Dar El Beïda district of Algiers, Algeria. It is currently used mostly for football matches. It is frequently used by the Algeria A' national football team and the Algerian Under-23 National Team. also is the home ground of Paradou AC and CRB Dar El Beïda. The stadium holds 14,150 spectators.

The stadium was used as one of the venues for the 2009 African Under-17 Championship and hosted the final of the competition.

On August 18, 2022, the administration of USM Alger agreed with the authorities of Dar El Beïda to receive the 2022–23 season at Omar Benrabah Stadium in the presence of the supporters.

References

Sports venues in Algiers
Football venues in Algeria